The 1924 Indiana gubernatorial election was held on November 4, 1924. Republican nominee Edward L. Jackson defeated Democratic nominee Carleton B. McCulloch with 52.92% of the vote.

Primary elections
Primary elections were held on May 6, 1924.

Republican primary

Candidates
Edward L. Jackson, Secretary of State of Indiana
Samuel Lewis Shank, Mayor of Indianapolis
Edward C. Toner 
Edgar D. Bush, former Lieutenant Governor under James P. Goodrich
Ora D. Davis
Elias W. Dulberger

Results

General election

Candidates
Major party candidates
Edward L. Jackson, Republican
Carleton B. McCulloch, Democratic

Other candidates
Francis M. Wampler, Socialist
Basil L. Allen, Prohibition

Results

References

1924
Indiana
Gubernatorial